Abai Kazakh National Pedagogical University is one of the leading institutes in Central Asia. It is situated in the heart of Almaty City, Kazakhstan. In 2003 Abai University had a record enrollment of more than 23,000 students, mostly from Kazakhstan and other Central Asian countries.

History
The first Kazakh institute of higher learning, which was named Kazakh State University, on September 1, 1928. It had one unique faculty - pedagogical with three separations:
physico-mathematic
natural studies
linguistic studies

It was assumed to create other three faculties: pedagogical, agricultural and medical. They were supposed to work from 1932 to 1933. On behalf of intensive development of folk education newly opened institute of higher education  decided to develop as an independent pedagogical college. Therefore, in 1930 the university was renamed as Kazakh State Pedagogical College (KAZPI), and in 1935 it was renamed as Abai State University and when expanded its fields of studies in 1989 it was named just Abai University as there were more courses than technical education.
Today's Abai University started its work in a small one-story building of Vernenskoy as a Women's School.

List of Faculties
 Philological faculty
 Faculty of Physics and Mathematics
 Faculty of History
 Faculty of Eco-Geology
 Faculty of Bio-Chemistry
 Faculty of Psychology
 Faculty of Arts
 Faculty of Economic Sciences
 Faculty of International Relations
 Preparatory faculty (For International Students)

Distance learning
The university was the first Kazakh university to start a distance learning programme in 2001. Today the university is offering more than 12 degree programmes and 11 certificate programmes through DL, which are accessible online in Russian language and Kazakh language as well.

References

External links
Home Page of Abai Kazakh National Pedagogical University
Implementation programme of Abai Kazakh National Pedagogical University
Distance Learning through Abai University

1928 establishments in the Kazakh Autonomous Socialist Soviet Republic
Education in Almaty
Educational institutions established in 1928
Universities and institutes established in the Soviet Union
Universities in Kazakhstan